Anne McEwen may refer to:

 Annie McEwen (1900–1967), wife of Australian Prime Minister John McEwen
 Anne McEwen (politician) (born 1954), Australian Labor Party politician
 Ann McEwen, West Indian cricketer